Eriks Ādamsons (22 June 1907 – 28 February 1946) was a Latvian writer, poet and novelist.

Biography 
Eriks Ādamsons was born in Riga on 22 June 1907. In 1926 he started law studies in Latvian University. He made his first publication in 1924. In the 1930s he fully devoted himself to literature. Ādamsons also worked as translator (he knew: Russian, German, English and French languages). He married young Latvian writer Mirdza Ķempe in 1931, but their marriage broke apart shortly before World War II.

In the years of German occupation he worked in book store and also in lumbering. His works were banned by German authorities, so he published under the pseudonym Eriks Rīga. In those years his health declined and he caught tuberculosis. In 1943 he started collect materials for book about Latvian painter Kārlis Padegs. This work was never finished.
In 1944 Eriks Ādamsons married the widow of Kārlis Padegs, Elvīra Berta Padega, who also suffered from tuberculosis. In 1945 they had a son Askolds, but he died after a few months.
In 1946 Ādamsons health declined very fast and he died in Biķernieki sanatorium on 28 February 1946. He is buried at the Rainis Cemetery in Riga.

Literature 
Eriks Ādamsons was known as an aesthete in life and also in his works. His novels and poems are sometimes called ornamental literature because of attention to smallest details.
His poetry is referred to through dekadence, baroque, rococo and jugendstil. His biggest influences were works by Oscar Wilde and Knut Hamsun.

Works
"Sudrabs ugunī" (1932)
"Smalkās kaites" (1937)
"Ģerboņi" (1937)
"Saules pulkstenis" (1941)
"Lielais spītnieks" (1942)
"Sava ceļa gājējs" (1943–1944)
"Sapņu pīpe" (1951)

References

1907 births
1946 deaths
Writers from Riga
People from Kreis Riga
Latvian novelists
Latvian male poets
Latvian translators
20th-century translators
20th-century novelists
20th-century Latvian poets
20th-century deaths from tuberculosis
20th-century male writers
Tuberculosis deaths in Latvia
Tuberculosis deaths in the Soviet Union